The 1946 United States Senate election in Washington was held on November 5, 1946. Incumbent Democrat Hugh Mitchell, who had been appointed to fill the unexpired term of Monrad Wallgren, ran for a full term in office, but was defeated by Republican Mayor of Tacoma Harry Cain.

Blanket primary

Candidates

Democratic
Sam C. Herren
Russell Fluent, Washington State Treasurer
Hugh Mitchell, interim U.S. Senator since 1945

Republican
Harry Cain, Mayor of Tacoma
J. Parkhurst Douglass

Results

General election

Results

See also 
 1946 United States Senate elections

References

1946
Washington
United States Senate